is a tram station on the Tosa Electric Railway's Ino Line in Kōchi, Kōchi Prefecture, Japan.

Railway stations in Kōchi Prefecture
Railway stations in Japan opened in 1906